Pisum is a genus of flowering plants in the family Fabaceae, native to southwest Asia and northeast Africa. It contains one to five species, depending on taxonomic interpretation; the International Legume Database (ILDIS) accepts three species, one with two subspecies:
Pisum abyssinicum (syn. P. sativum subsp. abyssinicum)
Pisum fulvum
Pisum sativum - pea
Pisum sativum subsp. elatius (syn. P. elatius, P. syriacum)
Pisum sativum subsp. sativum

Pisum sativum (the field or garden pea) is a major human food crop (see pea and split pea).

Pisum species are used as food plants by the larvae of some Lepidoptera species including Bucculatrix pyrivorella, cabbage moth, common swift, ghost moth, Hypercompe indecisa, the nutmeg, setaceous Hebrew character and turnip moth.

The Pisum sativum flower has 5 sepals (fused), 5 petals, 10 stamens (9 fused in a staminal tube and 1 stamen is free) and 1 subsessil carpel.

Etymology
‘Pisum’ is the ancient Latin name for the pea.

References

Fabeae
Fabaceae genera